The following is a list of the 449 communes of the Ardennes department of France.

The communes cooperate in the following intercommunalities (as of 2020):
Communauté d'agglomération Ardenne Métropole
Communauté de communes Ardenne rives de Meuse
Communauté de communes Ardennes Thiérache
Communauté de communes de l'Argonne Ardennaise
Communauté de communes des Crêtes Préardennaises
Communauté de communes du Pays Rethélois
Communauté de communes des Portes du Luxembourg
Communauté de communes Vallées et Plateau d'Ardenne

References

Ardennes